Afghan Jet International Airlines was a regional airline based in Afghanistan; it was headquartered in Kabul and based at Hamid Karzai International Airport. It offered service to five airports. On June 15, 2016, Afghan Jet ceased operations.

Destinations
Afghan Jet International served the following destinations as of August 2014:

Fleet
The Afghan Jet International fleet consisted of the following aircraft (as of August 2016):

References

Defunct airlines of Afghanistan
Airlines established in 2014
Airlines disestablished in 2016
2014 establishments in Afghanistan
Airlines formerly banned in the European Union